Alexandra Susanna Rapaport (born 26 December 1971  in Bromma) is a Swedish film and stage actress. She studied at the Teaterhögskolan i Stockholm, from which she graduated in 1997. She then worked for Uppsala Theatre before becoming engaged by Dramaten in Stockholm, where she is part of the permanent ensemble and has participated a number of classic plays.

She has featured in more than 40 feature films and TV series, among them the crime series Sandhamn Murders, Gåsmamman and Heder.

Personal life
Her parents were both from Poland. Her father, Edmund Rapaport (1923–2020), was a Polish Jew who fled to Sweden during World War II and became a statistician. Her mother, Ewa Rapaport (1938–1981), was an architect.

She and her husband, Joakim Eliasson, had a son in 2007 and a daughter in 2010.

She was aunt to Swedish alpine free-skier Matilda Rapaport, who died in an avalanche accident in 2016.

Selected filmography
Tsatsiki, morsan och polisen (1998) - Tina
Executive Protection (2000) - Pernilla
Kronprinsessan (2006) (TV) – Charlotte Ekeblad
A Midsummer Night's Party (2009) – Sofia
Morden i Sandhamn (2010–present) (TV) – Nora Linde
The Crown Jewels (2011) - Marianne Fernandez
The Hunt (2012) - Nadja
Once Upon a Time in Phuket (2012) - Siri
The Team (2015) (TV) – Liv Eriksen
Modus (2015-2017) (TV) - Ulrika Sjöberg
Gåsmamman (2015-present) (TV) - Sonja Nordin Ek
Spring Tide (2018) (TV) - Charlotte Pram
Kieler Street (2018) – Nina Novak/Alina
Heder (2019-present) (TV) - Nour

See also
Rappaport

References

Sources
'Mish Mash', Judisk Krönika, 1-1999

External links

1971 births
Living people
Swedish film actresses
Swedish stage actresses
Swedish people of Polish-Jewish descent
Swedish Jews